Chrysallida fenestrata is a species of sea snail, a marine gastropod mollusk in the family Pyramidellidae, the pyrams and their allies. The species is one of a number within the genus Chrysallida.

References

External links
 
 To CLEMAM
 To Encyclopedia of Life

fenestrata
Molluscs of the Atlantic Ocean
Molluscs of the Mediterranean Sea
Gastropods described in 1848